Gaul was an ancient region in Western Europe approximating present-day France, Belgium, north Italy and adjacent areas.

Gaul
Gaul may also refer to:

 Gaul (surname), a surname
 FV Gaul, a British trawler lost at sea in 1974
 Gauls, the native Celtic population of Gaul
 Roman Gaul, the region as part of the Roman Empire
 Diocese of Gaul of the Roman Empire in the 4th–5th centuries A.D.

GAUL
The acronym GAUL may refer to:

 Global Administrative Unit Layers, a project by the FAO to map all administrative units in the world.

See also 

 
 
 Point au Gaul
 Gallo (disambiguation)
 Galle (disambiguation)
 Gall (disambiguation)